Cuenotia is a genus of flowering plants belonging to the family Acanthaceae.

Its native range is Northeastern Brazil.

Species:
 Cuenotia speciosa Rizzini

References

Acanthaceae
Acanthaceae genera